Qanat-e Bahram Beygi (also Romanized as Qanāt-e Bahrām Beygī; also known as Qanāt) is a village in Pataveh Rural District, Pataveh District, Dana County, Kohgiluyeh and Boyer-Ahmad Province, Iran. At the 2006 census, its population was 100, in 19 families.

References 

Populated places in Dana County